Munden is a city in Republic County, Kansas, United States.  As of the 2020 census, the population of the city was 96.

History
Munden was founded in September 1887. It was named for John Munden, original owner of the town site.

Geography
Munden is located at  (39.913471, -97.538715).

Demographics

2010 census
At the 2010 census there were 100 people in 49 households, including 30 families, in the city. The racial makup of the city was 100.0% White.
Of the 49 households 24.5% had children under the age of 18 living with them, 49.0% were married couples living together, 8.2% had a female householder with no husband present, 4.1% had a male householder with no wife present, and 38.8% were non-families. 34.7% of households were one person and 6.1% were one person aged 65 or older. The average household size was 2.04 and the average family size was 2.57.

The median age was 48.9 years. 20% of residents were under the age of 18; 5% were between the ages of 18 and 24; 15% were from 25 to 44; 48% were from 45 to 64; and 12% were 65 or older. The gender makeup of the city was 50.0% male and 50.0% female.

2000 census
At the 2000 census there were 122 people in 54 households, including 32 families, in the city. The racial makup of the city was 98.36% White, 1.64% from other races. Hispanic or Latino of any race were 1.64%.

Of the 54 households 24.1% had children under the age of 18 living with them, 55.6% were married couples living together, and 40.7% were non-families. 38.9% of households were one person and 14.8% were one person aged 65 or older. The average household size was 2.26 and the average family size was 3.06.

The age distribution was 26.2% under the age of 18, 3.3% from 18 to 24, 30.3% from 25 to 44, 21.3% from 45 to 64, and 18.9% 65 or older. The median age was 39 years. For every 100 females, there were 106.8 males. For every 100 females age 18 and over, there were 114.3 males.

The median household income was $25,000 and the median family income  was $30,750. Males had a median income of $20,000 versus $28,333 for females. The per capita income for the city was $12,649. There were 11.4% of families and 16.2% of the population living below the poverty line, including 33.3% of under eighteens and none of those over 64.

Education
The community is served by Republic County USD 109 public school district. It was formed in 2006 by the consolidation of Belleville USD 427 and Hillcrest USD 455.  The Republic County High School mascot is Republic County Buffaloes.

Munden schools were closed through school unification. The Munden High School mascot was Munden Bulldogs.

References

Further reading

External links
 Munden - Directory of Public Officials
 Munden city map, KDOT

Cities in Kansas
Cities in Republic County, Kansas